Hotokebara Dam is a gravity dam located in Fukui Prefecture in Japan. The dam is used for power production. The catchment area of the dam is 437.9 km2. The dam impounds about 29  ha of land when full and can store 3723 thousand cubic meters of water. The construction of the dam was started on 1965 and completed in 1968.

References

Dams in Fukui Prefecture
1968 establishments in Japan